The Oolenoy River is a minor tributary of the Saluda River sourced near Sassafras Mountain in northern Pickens County, South Carolina. Approximately 37 miles in length, it empties into the South Fork Saluda River near the Pumpkintown Community. It is part of the Santee River System.

Rivers of South Carolina
Tributaries of the Santee River
Rivers of Pickens County, South Carolina